Beaty is an unincorporated community in Fulton County, Illinois, United States. The community is located on U.S. Route 24, northeast of Astoria.

References

Unincorporated communities in Fulton County, Illinois
Unincorporated communities in Illinois